La Historia Live is live album by Héctor & Tito. Its physical version was released as a two disc album. The digital version has an outro that was not included on the CDs. Meaning that it is a digital exclusive.

Track listing

Sales and certifications

References 

Héctor & Tito albums
2003 live albums
Live reggaeton albums